Castlejordan is a village and townland in County Meath, Ireland. It is located in the south of the county, close to the border with County Offaly, to the south of Kinnegad.

Name 
Castlejordan is named for Jordan De Courcy, ancestor of the Norman De Courcy family. Following his uncle John De Courcys death in Downpatrick, Jordan De Courcy was exiled to Exeter. Upon his return to Ireland he built a castle in the area.

History 
Evidence of ancient settlement in the area include ringfort sites in the surrounding townlands of Kildangan and Harristown. There is a ruined medieval tower house in the village, which was historically associated with the Gifford family.

The Church of Ireland church in the village (built ) is now largely in ruin. The Roman Catholic church (built ) is still in use and dedicated to the Holy Trinity.

Amenities and sport
Castlejordan village contains a pub, a post office, and the Roman Catholic church. The local national (primary) school, Castlejordan Central National School (also known as St Ciarán's NS), had an enrollment of 85 pupils as of 2020.

Ballinabrackey GAA is the local Gaelic Athletic Association club.

See also 
 List of towns and villages in Ireland

References 

Towns and villages in County Westmeath